"Trying" is the 6th episode of the seventh season of the American television police sitcom series Brooklyn Nine-Nine, and the 136th overall episode of the series. The episode was written by Evan Susser and Van Robichaux and directed by Kim Nguyen. It aired on March 5, 2020, on NBC.

The show revolves around the fictitious 99th precinct of the New York Police Department in Brooklyn and the officers and detectives that work in the precinct. In this episode, Jake and Amy grow desperate in their attempt to have children and resort to different methods to get Amy pregnant. Meanwhile, Holt tries to convince Terry to put him on a different beat. Boyle and Rosa secretly raise a continuously growing family of guinea pigs in the precinct and Hitchcock quickly finds love after his last divorce.

According to Nielsen Media Research, the episode was seen by an estimated 1.82 million household viewers and gained a 0.6 ratings share among adults aged 18–49. The episode received mixed-to-positive reviews from critics, while critics praised the message of the episode, others felt that it had no character development and the subplots received criticism.

Plot
Jake (Andy Samberg) and Amy (Melissa Fumero) are trying to have a child, but neither are fully convinced on the best way to conceive. Jake decides to raise the stakes by doing the "Jake Way".

The first idea involves Jake leading Amy through clues and finding him to have sex. Despite that, Amy still fails to get pregnant. They decide to adopt the "Amy Way" where they schedule their next sex sessions and hope for the best. They try this for six months but Amy still does not become pregnant. With no other choice, they try the "Hitchcock Way" which involves making every worst possible decision. When this still fails, Amy decides that she is "done" with trying to have a baby. Later, they talk and decide that it's just something that will come someday, even if they can't control it. They have sex and while the result is still the same, they feel more comfortable now.

Meanwhile, Holt (Andre Braugher) asks Terry (Terry Crews) to put him on a different beat. Hitchcock (Dirk Blocker) gets divorced but quickly falls in love with a woman, but then accidentally ruins the paper containing her phone number. Using a tooth that fell out of her mouth, he and Scully (Joel McKinnon Miller) set out to track her down. They eventually find the Russian woman, Anna (Anna Bogomazova). Anna gets pregnant and they marry with Scully (Joel McKinnon Miller) officiating the ceremony. However, they find that Anna's baby is from another man and they divorce. Boyle (Joe Lo Truglio) must get rid of two guinea pigs as his son is allergic to them, and he hides them in a precinct room with the help of Rosa (Stephanie Beatriz). After the guinea pigs multiply and cause chaos, Terry decides to send them to a lab technician.

Reception

Viewers
According to Nielsen Media Research, the episode was seen by an estimated 1.82 million household viewers and gained a 0.6 ratings share among adults aged 18–49. This means that 0.6 percent of all households with televisions watched the episode. This was a 4% increase over the previous episode, which was watched by 1.74 million viewers and a 0.5 ratings share. With these ratings, Brooklyn Nine-Nine was the highest rated show on NBC for the night, seventh on its timeslot and ninth for the night, behind Last Man Standing, A Million Little Things, Carol's Second Act, The Unicorn, Mom, Young Sheldon, Station 19, and Grey's Anatomy.

Critical reviews
"Trying" received mixed-to-positive reviews from critics. LaToya Ferguson of The A.V. Club gave the episode a "B−" rating, writing, "'Trying,' technically has six months of material to cram in — and that's the joke — but as much as the episode keeps going and going, it lacks the substantial nature that one would expect from that device."

Alan Sepinwall of Rolling Stone wrote, "Fertility troubles are a familiar issue from both life and TV, and 'Trying' doesn't shoot for any grand statement on the subject. It just allows it to be a tough problem for our heroes to deal with, suggesting potential alternatives that could be explored later, but largely focusing on the emotional hardship." Nick Harley of Den of Geek gave it a perfect 5 star rating out of 5 and wrote, "Combining the perfect mixture of sweet and absurd with some surprising story decisions, 'Trying' is easily the best Brooklyn Nine-Nine episode of the season. Hopefully we can expect to see more format-busting episodes in the back half of Season 7. An episode like 'Trying' makes me feel like Scully officiating Hitchcock's wedding, just bursting with love for this show."

References

External links

2020 American television episodes
Brooklyn Nine-Nine (season 7) episodes